Coactosin-like protein (COTL1 or CLP) is a protein that in humans is encoded by the COTL1 gene.

Function 

This gene encodes one of the numerous actin-binding proteins which regulate the actin cytoskeleton. This protein binds F-actin, and also interacts with and thereby stabilizes 5-lipoxygenase (ALOX5). Although this gene has been reported to map to chromosome 17 in the Smith-Magenis syndrome region, the best alignments for this gene are to chromosome 16. The Smith-Magenis syndrome region is the site of two related pseudogenes.

Interactions 

COTL1 has been shown to interact with ALOX5.  ALOX5 is the first committed enzyme in the metabolism of arachidonic acid to an array of biologically important cell signaling agents: a) the pro-inflammatory mediator, leukotriene B4 (LTB4); b) the airways constrictors, LTC4, LTD4, and LTE4; c) the 5-hydroxyeicosatetraenoic acid family of pro-inflammatory and pro-allergic reactions mediators, 5-HETE and 5-oxo-eicosatetraenoic acid. ALOX5 also contributes to the metabolism of arachidonic acid and other polyunsaturated fatty acids to agents which act block inflammation and allergic reactions, the specialized pro-resolving mediators of the lipoxin and resolvin subclasses. Based on in vitro studies, COTL1 serves to stabilize ALOX5, acting as a chaperone or scaffold, to avert the enzyme's inactivation and thereby to promote its metabolic activity.

References

External links

Further reading